First Congregational Church of Cuyahoga Falls (also known as Pilgrim United Church of Christ) is a historic church at 130 Broad Boulevard in Cuyahoga Falls, Ohio.

It was built in 1847 and added to the National Register of Historic Places in 1975.

References

External links
 Official website

United Church of Christ churches in Ohio
Churches on the National Register of Historic Places in Ohio
Churches completed in 1847
Churches in Summit County, Ohio
National Register of Historic Places in Summit County, Ohio
Cuyahoga Falls, Ohio
1847 establishments in Ohio